The Australasian Chronicle was a twice-weekly Catholic newspaper published in Sydney, New South Wales, Australia.  It was published in a broadsheet format. It was also published as The Morning Chronicle, The Chronicle and The Sydney Chronicle. It was the first Catholic newspaper published in Australia.

History 
First published on 2 August 1839, The Australasian Chronicle was published by Andrew Bent, for William Augustine Duncan, from 1839 to 1843.  Its stated aim was "to explain and uphold the civil and religious principles of the Catholics, and to maintain their rights".  The paper was started by Bishop Polding, OSB, and a learned Scottish immigrant, Duncan, a convert to Catholicism. It engaged in vigorous controversy in defence of Catholic interests.  It had several name changes to The Morning Chronicle, The Chronicle and The Sydney Chronicle.  It was eventually superseded by The Freeman's Journal which commenced publication on 27  June 1850.

Duncan was followed as editor by the Rev. John McEncroe and after him came McEncroe’s nephew Michael D’Arcy. Trove lists the Edward John Hawksley as the editor in 1848, just prior to him starting his own newspaper, The People’s Advocate and New South Wales Vindicator.

The publication defended Governor Gipps against attacks from the squatters and denounced the ill-treatment of Aborigines.

Digitisation 
The paper has been digitised as part of the Australian Newspapers Digitisation Program, a project of the National Library of Australia in cooperation with the State Library of New South Wales.

See also 
 List of newspapers in Australia
 List of newspapers in New South Wales

References

External links 

The Catholic Weekly
Isaacs, Victor, Kirkpatrick, Rod and Russell, John (2004). Australian Newspaper History: A Bibliography
Isaacs, Victor; Kirkpatrick, Rod, Two hundred years of Sydney newspapers: A short history, Rural Press Ltd.

Defunct newspapers published in Sydney
Publications established in 1843
1839 establishments in Australia
Newspapers on Trove